Rumelikavağı, also known as Rumeli Kavağı, is a neighborhood of Sarıyer district in İstanbul Province, Turkey. "Rumeli" is the Turkish name for Thrace, and "Kavak" means "control post" in Ottoman Turkish referring to the strategic position of the location on the Bosporous. The ferry pier which is the center of the neighborhood is at 

Formerly, it was a small fishing village. In the 17th century, a castle was built to check Cossack naval assaults from the Black Sea. In 1877, during the  Russo-Turkish War (1877-1878), a part of the immigrants from the Russian occupied provinces settled in Rumelikavağı. Up until the 1960s, most of Rumelikavağı was a restricted zone by military.

There are many places of interest in Rumelikavağı, such as ruins of medieval castles, mosques, churches, fountains, hamams etc. The Yavuz Sultan Selim Bridge over the Bosphorus is to the north of the neighborhood.

See also
Yoros Castle
Istanbul
Turkey
Byzantine Empire
Republic of Genoa
Ottoman Empire
Sultan Mehmed II

References

Neighbourhoods of Sarıyer
Bosphorus